C52 or C-52 may refer to:
 C-52 (cipher machine)
 , an Admirable-class minesweeper of the Mexican Navy
 Caldwell 52, an elliptical galaxy
 Company C, 52d Infantry Regiment (Anti-Tank) of the United States Army
 Courage C52, a French racing car
 Douglas C-52, an American transport aircraft
 Evans Gambit, a chess opening
 , a Fiji-class light cruiser of the Royal Navy
 Ikarus C52, German ultralight aircraft
 JNR Class C52, a Japanese steam locomotive
 Vaginal cancer